Lupareve is a village in Mykolaiv Raion (district) in Mykolaiv Oblast of southern Ukraine, at about  south by west from the centre of Mykolaiv city. It belongs to Halytsynove rural hromada, one of the hromadas of Ukraine.

Until 18 July 2020, Lupareve belonged to Vitovka Raion. The raion was abolished in July 2020 as part of the administrative reform of Ukraine, which reduced the number of raions of Mykolaiv Oblast to four. The area of Vitovka Raion was merged into Mykolaiv Raion. 

The village came under attack by Russian forces in 2022, during the Russian invasion of Ukraine.

References

Villages in Mykolaiv Raion, Mykolaiv Oblast